Karol Herman de Perthées (14 January 1740 – 21 November 1815) was a cartographer.

Life
He was born in Dresden, the illegitimate son of Herman Karl von Keyserling. In 1764 he was appointed court geographer and map-maker to Stanisław August Poniatowski, colonel of the Polish royal army. He produced a series of 1: 225,000 scale maps of the provinces of the former Republic of Poland, with five of them published in Paris, along with a hydrographic map of Poland (Carte hydrographique de Pologne) in 1809.

He was ennobled in 1768 and moved to Vilnius in 1798, where he lectured on cartography, died and was buried (in the city's Protestant Cemetery).

References

1740 births
1815 deaths
People from Dresden
People from the Electorate of Saxony
German cartographers
German geographers